The Korvpalli Meistriliiga, known as the Paf Korvpalli Meistriliiga for sponsorship reasons, is the highest tier of professional basketball league in Estonia. It is controlled by the Estonian Basketball Association.

The first Estonian Basketball Championship tournament was held in 1925. During Soviet era (1941–1991) the league was called the Estonian Soviet Socialist Republic Championship. After Estonia regained its independence in 1991, the league was reformed as the Korvpalli Meistriliiga (KML). The KML, which is played under FIBA rules, currently consists of nine teams. The current KML champions are Pärnu who won their first Estonian Championship in the 2022 KML Play-offs.

Current clubs

Venues and locations

Title holders

 1925: Tallinna Sport
 1927: Kalev
 1928: Tallinna Vitjas
 1929: Tallinna Russ
 1930: Kalev
 1931: Kalev
 1932: Tallinna Russ
 1933: Tallinna Russ
 1934: Tartu NMKÜ
 1935: Tallinna NMKÜ
 1936: Tartu NMKÜ
 1937: Tartu NMKÜ
 1938: Tartu EASK
 1939: Tartu EASK
 1940: Tartu EASK
 1941: Tallinna Dünamo
 1943: Kalev
 1944 Summer: Tartu Kalev
 1944 Winter: Kalev
 1945: Kalev
 1946: Kalev
 1947: Kalev
 1948: Tartu ÜSK
 1949: Tartu ÜSK
 1950: Tartu ÜSK
 1958: TRÜ
 1959: TRÜ
 1960: EPA
 1961: TPI
 1962: TPI
 1963: TPI
 1964: TPI
 1965: TPI
 1966: TPI
 1967: Kalev
 1968: Kalev
 1969: TRÜ
 1970: TRÜ
 1971: Kalev
 1972: TRÜ
 1973: TRÜ
 1974: Harju KEK
 1975: TRÜ
 1976: TRÜ
 1977: TRÜ
 1977–78: TRÜ
 1978–79: Harju KEK
 1980: Standard
 1981: Metallist
 1981–82: Standard
 1982–83: Standard
 1983–84: TPI
 1984–85: TPI
 1985–86: Standard
 1986–87: Standard
 1987–88: Standard
 1988–89: Standard
 1989–90: Standard
 1990–91: Asto
 1991–92: Kalev
 1992–93: Kalev/Rafter
 1993–94: Asto
 1994–95: Kalev/Auma
 1995–96: Kalev
 1996–97: Tallinn
 1997–98: Kalev
 1998–99: Tallinn
 1999–00: Tartu Ülikool-Delta
 2000–01: Tartu Ülikool-Delta
 2001–02: Kalev
 2002–03: Kalev
 2003–04: TÜ/Rock
 2004–05: Ehitustööriist
 2005–06: Kalev/Cramo
 2006–07: TÜ/Rock
 2007–08: TÜ/Rock
 2008–09: Kalev/Cramo
 2009–10: TÜ/Rock
 2010–11: Kalev/Cramo
 2011–12: Kalev/Cramo
 2012–13: Kalev/Cramo
 2013–14: Kalev/Cramo
 2014–15: TÜ/Rock
 2015–16: Kalev/Cramo
 2016–17: Kalev/Cramo
 2017–18: Kalev/Cramo
 2018–19: Kalev/Cramo
 2020–21: Kalev/Cramo
 2021–22: Pärnu Sadam

Titles by club

‡ Note: In the 1944 season two championship tournaments were held (s – summer tournament; w – winter tournament).

KML Finals

Awards
 KML Most Valuable Player Award
 KML Finals Most Valuable Player Award
 KML Best Young Player Award
 KML Best Defender Award
 KML Coach of the Year
 All-KML Team

See also
 Estonian Basketball Cup

References

External links

 
Basketball leagues in Estonia
Basketball leagues in Europe
Basketball
Recurring sporting events established in 1925
1925 establishments in Estonia